RoboBOARD/FX was a computer software first introduced by Hamilton TeleGraphics Inc, written by the owner Seth Hamilton in 1992.

At a time where BBS Software (such as RemoteAccess) were merely using ANSI art interfaces RoboBOARD started a revolution. It was the first fully graphical BBS system with iconic navigation, punchy bitmaps, and vector fonts, all at a time when ultra-fast high-speed modems were barely clocking 2400 bit/s.

RoboBOARD/FX provided a familiar looking graphical user interface for DOS, complete with dragging windows, clicking buttons, scrollbars, pop up dialogue boxes and templates. In this GUI environment RoboBOARD/FX supported graphics modes of up to 1024 x 768 in 16/256 SVGA color.

One of the biggest improvements RoboBOARD/FX brought into the BBS world was it built-in photographic capabilities, which allowed a BBS to display images to its users in real-time, without requiring a pre-download.

External links 

Bulletin board system software
DOS software